Sandvika is a village in Tvedestrand municipality in Agder county, Norway. The village is mentioned in the first scene of Richard Wagner's opera Der fliegende Holländer.

References

Villages in Agder
Tvedestrand